Paul Jonas may refer to:

 Kevin Jonas (Paul Kevin Jonas II, born 1987), American musician
 Paul Ramirez Jonas (born 1965), artist and arts educator

See also
Paul Jones (disambiguation)